Taking It All In Stride is the third studio album by New Zealand-born singer Mark Williams. It was released in June 1977. The album peaked at number 14 on the Official New Zealand Music Chart.

The album was the leading awardee at the 1976 New Zealand Music Awards gaining Producer, Engineer and Arranger Of The Year awards.

Track listing
LP/Cassette (HSD 1055)

Charts

References

1977 albums
EMI Records albums
Mark Williams (singer) albums